Vypolzovo is a rural locality (a village) in Krasnoselskoye Rural Settlement, Yuryev-Polsky District, Vladimir Oblast, Russia. The population was 1 as of 2010.

Geography 
Vypolzovo is located on the Kist River, 24 km northwest of Yuryev-Polsky (the district's administrative centre) by road. Gorki is the nearest rural locality.

References 

Rural localities in Yuryev-Polsky District